Jawan Vajidpur is a village of block & nagar panchayat Jawan Sikandarpur, Aligarh district in Northern India. It also known as Chhota Jawan.

Villages in Aligarh district